The Arkansas Court of Appeals is the intermediate appellate court for the state of Arkansas.  It was created in 1978 by Amendment 58 of the Arkansas Constitution, which was implemented by Act 208 of the Arkansas General Assembly in 1979.  The court handed down its first opinions for publication on August 8, 1979.

Jurisdiction
The jurisdiction of the Arkansas Court of Appeals is determined by the Arkansas Supreme Court.  There is no right of appeal from the Arkansas Court of Appeals to the Arkansas Supreme Court. However, opinions decided by the court may be reviewed by the Arkansas Supreme Court under three circumstances:  on application by a party to the appeal, upon certification of the Arkansas Court of Appeals, or if the Arkansas Supreme Court decides the case is one that should have originally been assigned to it.

Opinions
The Arkansas Court of Appeals issues a large number of opinions, but does not publish all of them.  Instead, only those opinions that "resolve novel or unusual questions" are released for publication by the state's Reporter of Decisions.

Judges
Originally, there were six judges on the court, this number was expanded by legislation to nine and then twelve.  The first judges of the court were appointed by Bill Clinton, during his first term as Governor of Arkansas.  The judges are now elected in staggered terms of eight years in a statewide, non-partisan election.

The state of Arkansas is divided into seven districts for the election of judges to the Arkansas Court of Appeals, under Act 1812 of 2003.  The qualifications for sitting on the Arkansas Court of Appeals are the same as for the Arkansas Supreme Court.

As of  the judges currently on the court are:

 Chief Judge Rita W. Gruber, District 6, Position 1
 Judge Raymond R. Abramson, District 1, Position 1
 Judge Phillip Whiteaker, District 1, Position 2
 Judge Bart Virden, District 2, Position 1
 Judge Mike Murphy, District 2, Position 2
 Judge Robert J. Gladwin, District 3, Position 1
 Judge Kenneth Hixson, District 3, Position 2
 Judge Brandon Harrison, District 4, Position 1
 Judge Meredith Switzer, District 4, Position 1
 Judge Mark Klappenbach, District 5
 Judge Larry D. Vaught, District 6, Position 2
 Judge Waymond M. Brown, District 7

See also
 Courts of Arkansas

References

External links

 Homepage of the Arkansas Court of Appeals
 Diagram of the structure of the Arkansas Court System

Court of Appeals
Courts and tribunals established in 1979
State appellate courts of the United States
1979 establishments in Arkansas